Headstones is a Canadian punk-influenced rock band formed in Kingston, Ontario in 1989, but on hiatus from 2003 to 2011. Consisting of vocalist Hugh Dillon, guitarist Trent Carr, bassist Tim White, keyboardist Steve Carr and Jesse Labovitz on drums, and a reputation for high energy, 'more rock less super shock' stage presence, and interaction with the audience, they frequently draw capacity crowds at mid-sized venues. Their songwriting tackles many serious and controversial topics. Between 1996 and 2016, Headstones were among the top 150-selling Canadian artists in Canada and among the top 35 best-selling Canadian bands in Canada.

History
The band signed to MCA Records in 1992 and released their debut album June 1993 Picture of Health. with original drummer Mark Gibson, who left the band after touring in support of the release. Dale Harrison was recruited for the follow-up Teeth and Tissue in 1995. To promote the album, the band went on a two-month, 44-city tour. In 1996, the Headstones received Juno Award nominations for Best Group and Best Rock Album. In 1997, the band released their next album, Smile and Wave. Three years later, Nickels for Your Nightmares was released, and both Carr and Harrison became fathers, while Dillon recovered from drug addiction.

The band released a compilation album, Greatest Fits, in 2001. In 2002, the band signed with MapleMusic, and released their next album, The Oracle of Hi-Fi. In September 2003, the band announced on their website that they had broken up, citing personal and professional causes.

Dillon started a new band, the Hugh Dillon Redemption Choir, whose debut album The High Co$t of Low Living was released in June 2005. Dillon has found success in acting, appearing in several films, including Hard Core Logo, Dance Me Outside, Trailer Park Boys: The Movie, Assault on Precinct 13 and the TV series Durham County, Degrassi: The Next Generation, Flashpoint and Continuum. In addition, their song "Come On" was featured in the videogame Triple Play 2002, and was also the theme for the Canadian version of the sketch comedy show, Comedy Inc.

White went on to become a music producer and composer for television and film, working at Imprint Music.

Reunion
Headstones reunited for four shows in February 2011, and eight more in December: two in Vancouver and one each in Edmonton, Calgary, Toronto, London, Guelph, Peterborough and Niagara Falls, New York.

After reforming the band and getting back onstage, the Headstones went back into the studio to record a new album. Released in 2013, Love + Fury was crowdfunded through PledgeMusic, before being released by Universal Music. The album garnered the band their first top 10 album, and #1 hit single "Long Way to Neverland". This was in followed in 2014 with another crowd-funded album, the acoustic covers collection One in the Chamber Music. The band's next album, Little Army, was released on June 2, 2017 on Known Accomplice, an imprint of Cadence Music Group. It includes the hit single "Devil's on Fire". With this release the band gave their fans an exclusive behind the scenes look into the making of the album, in real time.

A remastered edition of Picture of Health with bonus tracks was released in October 2018. On March 15, 2019, the band released a cover of Gordon Lightfoot's "The Wreck of the Edmund Fitzgerald". Their next album, PeopleSkills, was released by Known Accomplice on October 25, 2019, and is the band's first full album to be released on vinyl. The album's lead single, "Leave It All Behind", reached number 8 on the Billboard Canada Rock chart. The band's newest album, Flight Risk, was released on October 14, 2022.

Discography

Studio albums

Compilation albums

Singles

See also

Canadian rock
Music of Canada

References

External links
Official website

Musical groups established in 1987
Musical groups disestablished in 2003
Musical groups reestablished in 2011
Musical groups from Kingston, Ontario
Canadian alternative rock groups
1987 establishments in Ontario
2003 disestablishments in Ontario
2011 establishments in Ontario